The 2011 CAF Beach Soccer Championship were the qualifiers for African national beach soccer teams to determine the two teams that qualify for the 2011 FIFA Beach Soccer World Cup. They took place from 15–19 June 2011 at a temporary stadium at the Ain Diab beach in Casablanca, Morocco for the first time. All previous CAF qualifiers were held in Durban, South Africa.

Participating teams
Nine teams, the same number of teams that participated in the 2009 qualifiers, confirmed their participation in the competition:
 
 
 
 
 
 
 
 
 

It was originally announced that Congo DR would field a team for this tournament, but were forced to withdraw due to what is termed as 'serious administrative problems.'

Group stage
Due to Congo DR's withdrawal, it was determined that the nine teams will be divided into three groups of three, with the teams in each group participating in a round-robin format. The winners of each group, along with the best second-place finisher, will advance to the knockout round.

The draw to determine the groupings and schedule for the nine teams was held in Casablanca on 13 June 2011.

All match times are correct to that of local time in Casablanca, being Western European Summer Time, (UTC +1).

Group A

Group B

Group C

Knockout stage

Seventh Place

Semifinals

Fifth Place

Third Place

Final

Winners

Awards

Teams Qualifying

Final Placement

References

.

2013
Qualification Caf
2011 in beach soccer